Mario Harte (born 30 August 1988) is a Barbadian international footballer who plays as a midfielder. He is currently playing for UWI Blackbirds. He was the top scorers during the 2016 Barbados Premier Division season.

International career

International goals
Scores and results list the Barbados's goal tally first.

References

External links
 

1988 births
Living people
Barbadian footballers
Barbados international footballers
Association football midfielders
Barbados Defence Force SC players
UWI Blackbirds FC players
Barbados under-20 international footballers
Barbados youth international footballers